The Slovak Handball Federation (SZH) is the administrative and controlling body for handball and beach handball in Slovak Republic. Founded in 1993, SZH is a member of European Handball Federation (EHF) and the International Handball Federation (IHF).

National teams
 Slovakia men's national handball team
 Slovakia men's national junior handball team
 Slovakia women's national handball team

Competitions
 Slovenská hadzanárska extraliga

References

External links
 Official website  
 Slovakia at the IHF website.
 Slovakia at the EHF website.

Handball in Slovakia
Handball
Sports organizations established in 1993
1993 establishments in Slovakia
Handball governing bodies
European Handball Federation
National members of the International Handball Federation